Field hockey was introduced to the South Asian Games as a men's competition at the 1995 Games in Madras, India, with five teams, India, Pakistan, Bangladesh, Sri Lanka and Nepal, taking part. A women's competition was introduced in 2016.

Men's

Summaries

All-time medal table

Women's

Summaries

All-time medal table

References

Sports at the South Asian Games
 
Field hockey at multi-sport events
South Asia Games